The 2019 Campeonato Paraense Finals was the final that decided the 2019 Campeonato Paraense, the 107th season of the Campeonato Paraense. The final were contested between Independente and Remo. 

Remo defeated Independente 2–1 on aggregate to win their 46th Campeonato Paraense title.

Road to the final
Note: In all scores below, the score of the home team is given first.

Format
The finals were played on a home-and-away two-legged basis. If tied on aggregate, the penalty shoot-out was used to determine the winner.

Matches

First leg

Second leg

{| width="100%"
|valign="top" width="40%"|

See also
2020 Copa Verde
2020 Copa do Brasil

References

Campeonato Paraense Finals